Claudio Riaño (born 4 August 1988) is an Argentine professional footballer who plays as a striker for Central Córdoba in the Argentine Primera División.

Honours

Necaxa
 Copa MX: Clausura 2018
 Supercopa MX: 2018

References

External links

1988 births
Living people
Argentine footballers
Argentine expatriate footballers
Association football forwards
Racing de Córdoba footballers
Talleres de Córdoba footballers
San Martín de San Juan footballers
Boca Juniors footballers
Club Atlético Independiente footballers
Unión de Santa Fe footballers
Club Necaxa footballers
Rosario Central footballers
Central Córdoba de Santiago del Estero footballers
Argentine Primera División players
Liga MX players
Argentine expatriate sportspeople in Mexico
Expatriate footballers in Mexico
Footballers from Córdoba, Argentina